Donald Clark Paup (April 2, 1939 – August 7, 2012) was an American badminton player who won national and international titles from the mid-1960s to the early 1980s. Primarily a doubles specialist, he was known for his quick racket and tactical astuteness. He was ranked first in U.S. men's doubles for twelve consecutive seasons (1965–1976); all but the last of these in a partnership with fellow left-hander Jim Poole which was consistently competitive at the world class level. Paup and Poole reached the finals of men's doubles at the U.S. Open Championships five times, winning twice, and were undefeated in all five of the closed national championships in which they competed as a team. Paup was a member of all U.S. Thomas Cup teams between 1963 and 1973. He was elected to the U.S. Badminton Hall of Fame, now called the Walk of Fame, in 1973.

He refereed for badminton in the 1996 Summer Olympics in Atlanta.

He died in 2012 after struggling for a number of years with Parkinson's disease.

Major Achievements in Badminton

References

American male badminton players
1939 births
2012 deaths